Mary Dixey (born 25 February 1961) is an American former rugby union player. She was a member of the  squad that won the inaugural 1991 Women's Rugby World Cup defeating  19-6 in the final. She played at the Flyhalf position for the Women's Eagles.  Her Eagle appearances include matches against The Netherlands, Wales, Canada, Japan, & Ireland.  She scored a try as an Eagle in the United States and Ireland quarter-final match in the 1994 Women's Rugby World Cup in Edinburgh, Scotland.

References

1961 births
Living people
United States women's international rugby union players
American female rugby union players